The 4th 10 Hours of Messina was a sports car race, held on 26 August 1956 in the street circuit of Messina, Italy.

In this edition Automobile Club d'Italia to avoid the cancellation he decided to reduce the race to only 5 hours starting at 20 and arriving at 1 in the night, moreover, the route has been reduced by about a kilometer to free the transit for the Regina Margherita hospital.

Final standings
 Started:	24
 Classified:	11

See also
 Messina Grand Prix (auto race that replaced it)

References

External links
 La 10 Ore di Messina, la storia 

10 Hours of Messina